Burn It Down is the fourth studio album by the Australian-American hard rock band The Dead Daisies. It was released on April 6, 2018 by Spitfire Music.

Track listing
Songwriting credits from liner notes. All tracks written by Doug Aldrich, John Corabi, Marti Frederiksen, David Lowy and Marco Mendoza unless otherwise noted.

Personnel
Credits are adapted from liner notes.

Doug Aldrich – guitar
John Corabi – vocals
David Lowy – guitar
Marco Mendoza – bass guitar, backing vocals
Deen Castronovo – drums, backing vocals

Additional personnel
Marti Frederiksen – keys, percussion, backing vocals, production, additional engineering

Production 
Anthony Focx – mixing
Tim Brennan – engineering
Brent Mitschke – engineering assistance
Lee Hollister – band technician and coordination
Kari Smith – production assistance
Howie Weinberg – mastering
Sebastien Rohde – front cover, artwork, graphic design
David Edwards – management

Charts

References

2018 albums
The Dead Daisies albums
Albums produced by Marti Frederiksen